The Institute of Applied Astronomy of the Russian Academy of Sciences (name in Russian: Институт прикладной астрономии — official name in Russian: Федеральное государственное бюджетное учреждение науки Институт прикладной астрономии Российской академии наук (Federal State Budgetary Institution of Science Institute of Applied Astronomy of the Russian Academy of Sciences) — abbreviated name in Russian: ИПА РАН — abbreviated name in English: IAA RAS) is  one of the world's largest astronomical institutes, known for research in ephemeris astronomy, classical and relativistic celestial mechanics, radio astronomy and radio interferometry, space geodesy, fundamental coordinate-time support, and development of new methods in astrometry and geodynamics.

Directors 
 1988–2011 Andrey Mikhailovich Finkelstein
 2011–2017 Alexander Vasilievich Ipatov
 2017–present Dmitry Viktorovich Ivanov

History 
The institute was formed on November 13, 1987 by the order number 941 of the Presidium of the USSR Academy of Sciences.

In 2012 the type and full name of the institute was changed to Федеральное государственное бюджетное учреждение науки Институт прикладной астрономии Российской академии наук (Federal State Budgetary Institution of Science Institute of Applied Astronomy of the Russian Academy of Sciences), by resolution number 262, dated December 13, 2011, of the Presidium of the Russian Academy of Sciences. The abbreviated name remained the same.

Main directions of scientific activity 
 Research in the field of astronomy, ephemeris astronomy and space geodesy.
 Research in the field of terrestrial radio interferometry with very long baselines and radio astronomy.
 Research in the field of classical and relativistic celestial mechanics.
 Research in the field of fundamental coordinate-time support.
 Construction of fundamental reference systems and determination of the parameters of the Earth's rotation.
 Research in the field of radio astronomy and geodetic instrumentation.
 Publication of astronomical and specialized yearbooks, ephemeris of minor planets and other official coordinate-time publications.
 Operation and modernization of software systems for the radio interferometric network "Kvasar-KVO".

Departments of the Institute

Department of Radio Astronomy Equipment 
 Laboratory of antennas and antenna measurements
 Laboratory of radio astronomy receiving devices
 Signal conversion and registration laboratory
 Laboratory of time and frequency
 Correlation processing laboratory
 Laboratory of Information and Computing Systems
 Correlation processing center

Department of Radio Astronomy Observations 
 Radio astronomy observatory "Svetloe" (Priozersky District)
 Radio astronomy observatory "Zelenchukskaya" (Zelenchuksky District)
 Radio astronomy observatory "Badary" (Irkutsk Oblast)
 Department of centralized operation of observatories

Department of Fundamental and Applied Astronomy 
 Laboratory of Ephemeris Astronomy
 Laboratory of Astronomical Yearbooks
 Laboratory of Space Geodesy and Earth Rotation
 Laboratory of Small Bodies of the Solar System
 Group of relativistic celestial mechanics

Prototype production 
 Design and Technology Group
 Radio installation site
 Mechanical section
 Locksmith area
 Welding area

Branch of the Department of Radiophysics of СПбПУ (SPbPU, Peter the Great St. Petersburg Polytechnic University)

Base Department of Radio Astronomy of СПбГЭТУ "ЛЭТИ" ("LETI", Saint Petersburg Electrotechnical University)

Publishing activity 
IAA RAS publishes Russian and international astronomical yearbooks and almanacs containing ephemerides of the Sun, Moon, planets, minor planets, and stars, calculated with maximum accuracy in accordance with the standards approved by the International Astronomical Union. The institute also publishes information about various astronomical phenomena, such as solar eclipses, lunar eclipses, risings and settings of the Sun and the Moon, planetary configurations, etc. These publications are Russia's only official ephemeris documents that can be used by different consumers and which can serve as an ephemeris standard for any relevant work.

IAA RAS publishes weekly bulletins for determining the parameters of the Earth's rotation, including the results of processing radio interferometric, laser and satellite observations on global networks of stations, together with their comparisons with the data of the International Earth Rotation and Reference Systems Service and the annual forecast.

Observations 
The Institute of Applied Astronomy of the Russian Academy of Sciences conducts regular radio interferometric and radio astronomical observations at radio astronomy observatories of the Kvazar-KVO network under international and Russian programs.

Location 
The divisions of the Institute of Applied Astronomy of the Russian Academy of Sciences are located in four constituent entities of the Russian Federation: (St. Petersburg, Leningrad Oblast, Karachay-Cherkess Republic, Republic of Buryatia).
 191187, St. Petersburg, Kutuzova, Embankment 10
 197110, St. Petersburg, Zhdanovskaya street, 8
 "Svetloe" radioastronomical observatory
 Longitude: 29°46'53" E
 Latitude: 60°31'57" N
 Address: 188833, Leningradskaya Oblast, Priozerskiy district, village Svetloe
 “Zelenchukskaya” radioastronomical observatory
 Longitude: 41°33'54" E
 Latitude: 43°47'18" N
 Address: 357140, Karachaevo-Circassian Republic, Zelenchukskiy district
 “Badary” radioastronomical observatory
 Longitude: 102°14'06" E
 Latitude: 51°46'11" N
 Address: 671021, Buryatiya Republic, Tunkinskiy district, urochishche Badary

References

Astrophysics institutes
Astronomical observatories in Russia
Radio astronomy
Institutes of the Russian Academy of Sciences
Research institutes in the Soviet Union
Astronomy in the Soviet Union
Research institutes established in 1987
1987 establishments in the Soviet Union